Michelle Thrush (born February 6, 1967) is a Canadian actress and First Nations activist for Aboriginal Canadians and the other Indigenous peoples of the Americas. She is best known for her leading role as Gail Stoney in Blackstone, for which she won the Gemini Award for Best Performance by an Actress in a Continuing Leading Dramatic Role in 2011, and her recurring roles as Sylvie LeBret in North of 60 and Deanna Martin in Arctic Air.

Thrush starred in the Palme d'Or and Cesar award-nominated film Jimmy P: Psychotherapy of a Plains Indian.

Early life
Thrush, who is Cree, was born and raised in Calgary, Alberta, Canada, by parents who were chronic alcoholics. She recalls being called "Squaw" at Bowness High School and bullied because of her parents' illness. In grade nine she changed schools and attended Calgary's Plains Indian Cultural Survival School, where she felt accepted for the first time. Commenting on her experience at that school, she stated: "There were other Native students there, and I learned so many wonderful things about myself, about my culture, about my language, about drumming and singing. They filled in a lot of the voids that my soul was just begging for."

Her childhood hardships affected her profoundly. Though she acted in her first film at 17, it did not occur to her it could be a career. She planned to become a social worker and help children.  She met Gordon Tootoosis, a First Nations actor, who told her: "If [acting] is what your heart wants, you need to follow it and be true." At this point her parents were sober. With no other ties to Calgary, at age 20 she moved to Vancouver and found an agent.

Career
Thrush has had a prolific career since its beginning in the 1980s.  She began her acting career in film while attending high school. She got her first theatre job when she moved to Vancouver at age 20. She had a small part in the play The Ecstasy of Rita Joe. She portrayed numerous recurring and guest roles in the television series Madison, Northern Exposure, North of 60, Highlander, Forever Knight, Nothing Too Good for a Cowboy, Moccasin Flats and Mixed Blessings.

She has starred in many notable films throughout her career, particularly in films that deal with issues about Indigenous peoples of the Americas, ranging from Canadian Aboriginals to Native Americans/American Indians (U.S.). These include Isaac Littlefeathers, Unnatural & Accidental, Bury My Heart at Wounded Knee, Skins, Dead Man, Dreamkeeper and Jimmy P: Psychotherapy of a Plains Indian.

In 2011, Thrush wrote the one-woman play Find Your Own Inner Elder. She has performed the show, most often under the title Inner Elder, across Canada. It premiered at One Yellow Rabbit's High Performance Rodeo in Calgary in 2018 and has since been performed with Nightwood Theatre and Native Earth Performing Arts in Toronto (2019). Inner Elder is a structured monologue which recounts Thrush's personal life and experiences.

Filmography

Television

Film

Theatre

Awards and nominations

References

External links

Canadian film actresses
Canadian television actresses
Actresses from Calgary
First Nations actresses
Cree people
Living people
Best Actress in a Drama Series Canadian Screen Award winners
1967 births